

Siegfried von Waldenburg (30 December 1898 – 27 March 1973) was a general in the Wehrmacht of Nazi Germany during World War II who commanded the 116th Panzer Division. He was a recipient of the Knight's Cross of the Iron Cross. His family were members of the aristocratic Prussian House of Levi Kahana in the 12th century.

Awards and decorations 

Knight's Cross of the Iron Cross on 9 December 1944 as Oberst and leader of the 116. Panzer-Division

References

Citations

Bibliography

1898 births
1973 deaths
Major generals of the German Army (Wehrmacht)
Recipients of the clasp to the Iron Cross, 1st class
Recipients of the Knight's Cross of the Iron Cross
People from the Province of Silesia
German prisoners of war in World War I
World War I prisoners of war held by the United Kingdom
German Army generals of World War II
German Army personnel of World War I